Callyspongiidae is a family of sea sponges in the order Haplosclerida. It contains the following genera and species:
 Arenosclera Pulitzer-Finali, 1982
 Arenosclera amazonensis Leal, Moraes, Thompson & Hajdu, 2017
 Arenosclera arabica (Keller, 1889)
 Arenosclera brasiliensis Muricy & Ribeiro, 1999
 Arenosclera digitata (Carter, 1882)
 Arenosclera heroni Pulitzer-Finali, 1982
 Arenosclera klausi Leal, Moraes, Thompson & Hajdu, 2017
 Arenosclera parca Pulitzer-Finali, 1982
 Arenosclera rosacea Desqueyroux-Faúndez, 1984
 Callyspongia Duchassaing & Michelotti, 1864
 Over 180 species. See genus page for complete list.
 Dactylia Carter, 1885
 Dactylia australis (Lendenfeld, 1889)
 Dactylia candelabrum (Lendenfeld, 1889)
 Dactylia ceratosa (Dendy, 1887)
 Dactylia clavata (Lendenfeld, 1889)
 Dactylia crispata (Lamarck, 1814)
 Dactylia dichotoma (Lendenfeld, 1886)
 Dactylia elegans (Lendenfeld, 1888)
 Dactylia illawarra (Lendenfeld, 1889)
 Dactylia imitans (Lendenfeld, 1886)
 Dactylia impar Carter, 1885
 Dactylia radix (Lendenfeld, 1888)
 Dactylia repens (Carter, 1886)
 Dactylia syphonoides (Lamarck, 1814)
 Dactylia varia (Gray, 1843)
 Siphonochalina Schmidt, 1868
 Siphonochalina asterigena (Schmidt, 1868)
 Siphonochalina balearica Ferrer-Hernandez, 1916
 Siphonochalina coriacea Schmidt, 1868
 Siphonochalina deficiens Pulitzer-Finali, 1982
 Siphonochalina expansa Sarà, 1960
 Siphonochalina fortis Ridley, 1881
 Siphonochalina intersepta (Topsent, 1928)
 Siphonochalina lyrata (Lamarck, 1814)

References

External links 

 
Sponge families